Jack Lea (born 21 Dec 1994) is a current rugby union player who plays hooker for Stourbridge after leaving Championship side Moseley RFC.

References

Moseley Rugby Football Club players
1994 births
Living people